P. C. Sanal Kumar (19 June 1949 – 8 November 2014)) was an Indian satirist who wrote in Malayalam. He was a retired IAS officer in Kerala, India. He was also the District Collector of Kasaragod and Pathanamthitta districts, India.

Literary career
P. C. Sanal Kumar won the Kerala Sahitya Academy Award in the year 2004. He won the Kerala Film Critics Association Award in 1989.

Published work

 Venal Pookal (Novel, 1987) (serialised in kumari weekly)
 Collector Kadha Ezhuthukayanu (Sahithya Academy award 2004)
 Paradeeyam (a collection of his parodies)
 Oomakkathinu Uriyada Marupadi
 Oru Clue Tharumo
  Ningal Kyoovilaanu

Death
He died suddenly in November 2014, aged 65.

References

External links
- Guruvandanam programme

1949 births
2014 deaths
Writers from Kerala
Indian satirists
Malayalam literary critics
Malayalam-language writers
Recipients of the Kerala Sahitya Akademi Award